Myers's Rum is a brand of Jamaican rum produced by Sazerac.
Named after brand founder Frederick Louis Myers, the molasses-derived blend of up to nine rums has been produced since 1879. Myers's rum uses "only pure Jamaican molasses" and is "produced from continuous and pot still distillation and is then matured for up to four years in white oak barrels".

The dark rum is commonly used in mixed drinks. It is also a common cooking ingredient in a variety of both sweet and savory recipes.

In November 2018, Diageo sold Myers's Rum and various other brands to the Sazerac Company for $550 million. It was part of a deal that saw the UK-based group increase its focus on premium spirits. The deal was announced in 2018, with the view that it would be completed in early 2019. It was instead completed before the end of the year and encompassed the sale of 19 brands, including Myers’s Rum.

References

Jamaican brands
Jamaican rum